Germán Fortino Sánchez Cruz (born July 31, 1967 in Zimatlán, Oaxaca) is a Mexican race walker.

Personal bests
20 km: 1:25:05 hrs –  A Coruña, 16 May 1998
50 km: 3:44:50 hrs –  Cheboksary, 17 Jun 2001

Achievements

*: Started as a guest out of competition.

References

External links
Tilastopaja biography

1967 births
Living people
Mexican male racewalkers
Athletes (track and field) at the 1992 Summer Olympics
Athletes (track and field) at the 1996 Summer Olympics
Athletes (track and field) at the 2000 Summer Olympics
Athletes (track and field) at the 2003 Pan American Games
Athletes (track and field) at the 2004 Summer Olympics
Olympic athletes of Mexico
People from Oaxaca
Pan American Games medalists in athletics (track and field)
Pan American Games gold medalists for Mexico
Central American and Caribbean Games silver medalists for Mexico
Competitors at the 1993 Central American and Caribbean Games
Central American and Caribbean Games medalists in athletics
Medalists at the 2003 Pan American Games
20th-century Mexican people
21st-century Mexican people